Haiyong is a town of Haimen District in Nantong, Jiangsu, China. Together with neighboring Qilong, it forms a pene-enclave of the province on Chongming Island, most of which belongs to the province-level municipality of Shanghai.

Location
Haiyong is a pene-enclave bordered on the south and west by Shanghai's Chongming County, on the east by Qidong's Qilong Township, and on the north by the Yangtze. Because of its unusual position, it is sometimes described in Chinese as "Shanghai in Jiangsu" or "Haimen on Chongming".

History
Yonglongsha, a shoal in the channel of the Yangtze north of Chongming Island, reappeared most recently in 1937. Workers from Haimen began to utilize the land in 1966 and, by 1968, had stabilized the land enough that the conflicting claims of Haimen and Qidong were mediated by Nantong, which divided the island between them. Over 3000 workers labored over the next year, reclaiming  by 1970. The area was then incorporated into Haimen in 1972 as the Yonglongsha Farm. Continuing reclamation projects and natural deposition of sediment joined it to Chongming Island in 1975. The present township was established in 1992. It was connected to Chongming's road network but this was only connected to Jiangsu by ferry service prior to the 2011 opening of the Chongqi Bridge between Chenjia and Qidong. Its area was recently increased by the addition of another  of reclaimed land.

Prior to Yonglongsha's absorption by Chongming, it offered ferry service to Haimen's Lingdian Harbor (t , s , p Língdiāngǎng) and Qidong's Sanhe Harbor (Sānhégǎng).

Haiyong Township was changed to Haiyong Town in September 2015.

Economy
Haiyong's main products are agricultural. Apart from rice, Shanan has 500 mu of land devoted to sugarcane production and another 500 mu devoted to watermelon and cotton, while a 1000 mu area of Yongbei grows a variety of vegetables, cotton, rape, and small melons such as hami melon, cantaloupe, and honeydew. The area also farms pigs, hairy crab, and whiteleg shrimp. The current plan is for the development of more green and organic farming to be marketed in Shanghai.

Government
The town of Haiyong forms part of the county-level city of Haimen, itself part of the prefecture-level city of Nantong in Jiangsu province. It is divided among the community of Tongjiang  Tōngjiāng Jiēshèqū) and the villages of Shanan  Shā'nán Cūn) and Yongbei  Yǒngběi Cūn).

See also
 Qilong Township
 List of enclaves and exclaves
 List of township-level divisions of Jiangsu

References

External links
 Official site 
  at Hudong Baike 
 Photos of the area at Around Guides
 Photos of the area in 2013 at Crazy Guy on a Bike

Township-level divisions of Jiangsu
Geography of Nantong